Forbesganj is a Community development block and a town in district of Araria, in Bihar state of India. It is one of the three blocks of Forbesganj subdivision. The headquarter of the block is at Forbesganj town.

Etymology
During the British Raj the area was under the administration of a British district collector and municipal commissioner, Alexander John Forbes (1807-1890) of East India Company. Forbes had a bungalow at the same location. Consequently the area was known as 'residential area' also abbreviated as 'R-area'. Over time the name transformed to 'Araria' and the neighbouring subdivision came to be known as 'Forbesganj'.

Gram Panchayats

The block is divided into many Village Councils and villages. There are multiple gram panchayats of Forbesganj block in Forbesganj subdivision, Araria district.

See also
Administration in Bihar

References

Community development blocks in Araria district